The Staffordshire Record Society is the record society for Staffordshire in England. It was originally formed in 1879 as the William Salt Archaeological Society based on the activities and collection of the antiquarian and banker William Salt. It changed its name to the Staffordshire Record Society in 1936.

References

External links
 

1880 establishments in England
Archaeology of England
History of Staffordshire
Text publication societies